José Francisco Sasía Lugo (27 December 1933 – 30 August 1996) was a Uruguayan footballer who played as a forward. He played for clubs of Uruguay, Argentina and Paraguay and in the Uruguay national team in the 1962 and 1966 FIFA World Cups.

Honours

Player
Peñarol
 Uruguayan Primera División: 1961, 1962, 1963
 Copa Libertadores: 1961
 Copa Intercontinental: 1961

Olimpia
 Paraguayan Primera División:

Uruguay
 Copa América: 1959

References

External links

 
 Profile at Zonacharrua.com
 

1933 births
1996 deaths
People from Treinta y Tres
Uruguayan footballers
Association football forwards
Uruguay international footballers
1962 FIFA World Cup players
1966 FIFA World Cup players
Copa América-winning players
Uruguayan Primera División players
Argentine Primera División players
Paraguayan Primera División players
Defensor Sporting players
Boca Juniors footballers
Peñarol players
Rosario Central footballers
Club Nacional de Football players
Racing Club de Montevideo players
Club Olimpia footballers
Uruguayan football managers
Rampla Juniors managers
Racing Club de Montevideo managers
C.A. Cerro managers
C.A. Progreso managers
S.D. Aucas managers
Liverpool F.C. (Montevideo) managers
Club Olimpia managers
Paraguay national football team managers
Aris Thessaloniki F.C. managers
Ethnikos Piraeus F.C. managers
Uruguayan expatriate footballers
Uruguayan expatriate football managers
Uruguayan expatriate sportspeople in Argentina
Expatriate footballers in Argentina
Uruguayan expatriate sportspeople in Paraguay
Expatriate footballers in Paraguay
Expatriate football managers in Paraguay
Uruguayan expatriate sportspeople in Greece
Expatriate football managers in Greece
Uruguayan expatriate sportspeople in Venezuela
Expatriate football managers in Venezuela